Burani is an Italian surname. Notable people with this surname include:

 Agostina Burani (born 1991), Argentinian basketball player.
 Francesco Burani, Baroque Italian designer and engraver
 Mariella Burani, founder of Mariella Burani Fashion Group
 Paul Burani (1845–1901), French author and actor

Italian-language surnames